Giovanni Battista Castrucci (1541–1595) was a Roman Catholic cardinal.

Episcopal succession

References

1541 births
1595 deaths
16th-century Italian cardinals